Belle de Brillet is a pear liqueur produced by Maison J. R. Brillet, France.  It is made by infusing Brillet cognac with the essence of Williams pears. Roughly  of pears are needed to produce each 750mL bottle.

Awards
Belle de Brillet was named one of the top 100 Spirits of 2016 by Wine Enthusiast magazine.

References

External links
Official web site

Brandies